Abhinaya is an Indian actress and model who mainly works in Tamil and Telugu films. She is both hearing and speech impaired. She made her acting debut in Naadodigal (2009) and then she has appeared in many Tamil and Telugu films.

Career
Abhinaya was spotted by director Samuthirakani from an ad agency's portfolio while he was on the lookout for a fresh face for his movie Nadodigal. The success of Naadodigal and critical acclaim for Abhinaya's performance led him to cast her in the Telugu remake Shambo Shiva Shambo, while she was signed to play the same role in its Kannada remake Hudugaru as well. She won two Filmfare Awards for her performances in Naadodigal and Shambo Shiva Shambo the following year. She was cast in an important role in Easan (2010) directed by Sasikumar. In 2011, A. R. Murugadoss signed her to play a supporting role alongside Suriya in the film 7aam Arivu.

In 2012, she had three Telugu releases. In Dammu and Dhamarukam she played the sister of Jr. NTR's and Nagarjuna's characters, respectively, while in Genius she played a Muslim character. That year she also got her first lead role in the Telugu film Chandrudu opposite Krishnudu but the film's release has been delayed. She was seen in minor supporting roles as part of an ensemble cast in the Telugu family drama Seethamma Vaakitlo Sirimalle Chettu (2013) and the Tamil action masala films Veeram (2014) and Hari's Poojai. The Reporter, the first Malayalam film, Abhinaya had signed, released after long delays in 2015. That year also saw her making her Bollywood debut in R. Balki's Shamitabh in a short role.

Among her upcoming films are Vizhithiru, in which she is playing a radio jockey, and Mela Thalam.

Filmography

References

External links

Indian film actresses
Actresses in Tamil cinema
Actresses in Telugu cinema
Living people
Actresses from Rajahmundry
Filmfare Awards South winners
21st-century Indian actresses
Deaf actresses
Actresses in Kannada cinema
Actresses in Malayalam cinema
Actresses from Andhra Pradesh
Indian deaf people
Mute people
Actresses in Hindi cinema
1991 births